Jeff Gill may refer to:
 Jeff Gill (academic)
 Jeff Gill (animator)